The 2017 Four National Figure Skating Championships included the Czech Republic, Slovakia, Poland, and Hungary. The event was held in December 2016 at the Spodek in Katowice, Poland. Skaters competed in the disciplines of men's singles, ladies' singles, and ice dancing.

The results were split by country; the three highest-placing skaters from each country formed their national podiums. The results were among the criteria used to determine international assignments. It was the ninth consecutive season that the Czech Republic, Slovakia, and Poland held their national championships together and the fourth season that Hungary participated.

Medals summary

Czech Republic

Slovakia

Poland

Hungary

Senior results

Men
Michal Březina, ranked first in the short program, withdrew after injuring his arm during the free skating.

Ladies

Ice dancing
Plutowska / Flemin withdrew after the short dance due to a back hernia.

References

External links
 2017 Four National Championships results

Four National Figure Skating Championships
Four National Figure Skating Championships
Four National Figure Skating Championships
Four National Figure Skating Championships
Four National Figure Skating Championships
Czech Figure Skating Championships
Slovak Figure Skating Championships
Polish Figure Skating Championships
Hungarian Figure Skating Championships